Spartacus is a ballet by Aram Khachaturian (1903–1978). The work follows the exploits of Spartacus, the leader of the slave uprising against the Romans known as the Third Servile War, although the ballet's storyline takes considerable liberties with the historical record. Khachaturian composed Spartacus in 1954, and was awarded a Lenin Prize for the composition that same year. It was first staged in Leningrad on 27 December 1956, as choreographed by Leonid Yakobson, for the Kirov Theatre of Opera and Ballet (Mariinsky Theatre), where it stayed in repertory for many years, but only with qualified success since Yakobson abandoned conventional pointe in his choreography. Yakobson restaged his version for the Bolshoi in 1962 and it was part of the Bolshoi's 1962 tour to New York. The ballet received its first staging at the Bolshoi Theatre, Moscow in 1958, choreographed by Igor Moiseyev; however it was the 1968 production, choreographed by Yury Grigorovich, which achieved the greatest acclaim for the ballet.

Spartacus remains one of Khachaturian's best known works and is prominent within the repertoires of the Bolshoi Theatre and other ballet companies in Russia and the former Soviet Union.

Synopsis
Principal Characters:

Crassus, Roman consul
Spartacus, captive king of Thrace
Phrygia, wife of Spartacus
Aegina, concubine to Crassus

Act I

The Roman consul Crassus returns to Rome from his latest conquests in a triumphal procession. Among his captives are the Thracian king Spartacus and his wife Phrygia. Spartacus laments his captivity and bids a bitter farewell to Phrygia, who is taken off to join Crassus’ harem of concubines. To entertain Crassus and his entourage, Spartacus is sent into the gladiatorial ring and is forced to kill a close friend. Horrified at his deed, Spartacus incites his fellow captives to rebellion.

Act II
The escaped captives celebrate their freedom. Meanwhile, Crassus entertains the Roman patricians with lavish entertainment. Spartacus and the other escaped captives disrupt the orgy and rescue the slave women, including Phrygia. Aegina insists that Crassus pursue the slave army immediately. The lovers celebrate their escape to the "Adagio of Spartacus and Phrygia".

Act III
Aegina discovers Spartacus's camp and observes the lovers emerging from their tent the next morning. Aegina sends word to Crassus, who sends his army in pursuit. Internecine struggles break out among Spartacus's forces. Finally, Crassus's forces discover Spartacus and impale him upon their spears.  Spartacus's closest followers recover his body and carry it off while Phrygia mourns her loss.

Orchestral adaptation

Khachaturian extracted and arranged music from the ballet in 1955 for four orchestral suites:
Spartacus Suite No.1
Introduction – Dance of the Nymphs
Adagio of Aegina and Harmodius
Variation of Aegina and Bacchanalia
Scene and Dance with Crotala
Dance of the Gaditanae – Victory of Spartacus
Spartacus Suite No.2
Adagio of Spartacus and Phrygia
Entrance of the Merchants – Dance of a Roman Courtesan –
General Dance
Entrance of Spartacus – Quarrel –
Treachery of Harmodius
Dance of the Pirates
Spartacus Suite No.3
Dance of a Greek Slave
Dance of an Egyptian Girl
Night Incident
Dance of Phrygia – Parting Scene
At the Circus
Spartacus Suite No.4
Bacchante's Melancholy Dance
Spartacus Procession
Death of the Gladiator
Call to Arms – Spartacus' Uprising

Instrumentation: 2 flutes, 2 oboes, 2 clarinets, 2 bassoons; 4 horns, 4 trumpets, 3 trombones, tuba; timpani, percussion ; strings.

In popular culture
 Part of the "Adagio of Spartacus and Phrygia" (the opening piece in Suite No. 2), was used as the main love theme in the 1968 film Mayerling; as the opening theme for the British television series The Onedin Line (1971–1980); in advertisements for Philips television sets in Australia in the late 1970s; and in The Hudsucker Proxy (1994). 
 Part of the "Adagio of Spartacus and Phrygia" was used in the film Caligula (1979). A disco version of this theme with lyrics by the artist Lydia was released as a single from the soundtrack.
 Spartakus, a 1977 Soviet musical/ballet film directed by Vadim Derbenyov and Yuri Grigorovich, which is also a remake of the Bolshoi Theater's 1968 production also choreographed by Grigorovich.
 The adagio had several plays during the James Bond film Thunderball.
 Portions of the ballet were performed by the Phantom Regiment Drum and Bugle Corps in 1981, 1982, and 2008 – with the Corps winning the 2008 DCI World Championship title, performing their interpretation of the ballet.
 In 1984, with words by Tony Hiller and Nicky Graham, it became a popular song, "Journey's End", recorded by Andy Williams on Capitol.  
 In 1990 Mexican rock band Caifanes used "Adagio of Spartacus and Phrygia" for their hit song "Antes de que nos olviden" (Before We're Forgotten) from their album El Diablito.
 In 2004, Ukrainian rhythmic gymnast Anna Bessonova performed her bronze medal ball routine at the Athens Olympics to an excerpt of the adagio. 
 Michelle Kwan used Adagio of Sparticus and Phrygia for her short program in the 2004-5 season, winning the 2005 US. Figure Skating Championships. 
 The adagio is featured toward the ending of 20th Century Fox's 2006 computer animated film  Ice Age: The Meltdown. 
 Oksana Domnina and Maxim Shabalin won the 2009 World Figure Skating Championships Ice Dance competition with their free dance to the adagio. 
 Ashley Wagner won the 2015 U.S. Figure Skating Championships with her short program to the adagio.

See also
 List of historical ballet characters

References

Ballets by Aram Khachaturian
Ballets by Yury Grigorovich
Ballets by Leonid Jacobson
1956 ballet premieres
1956 in the Soviet Union
Ballets based on actual events
Cultural depictions of Spartacus
Cultural depictions of Marcus Licinius Crassus
Orchestral suites
Ballets based on literature